Mohammadabad Rural District is in Zarach District of Yazd County, Yazd province, Iran. At the National Census of 2006, its population was 1,782 in 434 households. There were 2,813 inhabitants in 740 households at the following census of 2011. At the most recent census of 2016, the population of the rural district was 3,187 in 905 households. The largest of its 18 villages was Mohammadabad, with 3,107 people.

References 

Yazd County

Rural Districts of Yazd Province

Populated places in Yazd Province

Populated places in Yazd County